Tadigadapa is a part of Vijayawada and a municipality in the Krishna district of Andhra Pradesh, India from 1 january 2021. It is located in Penamaluru mandal of  revenue division.  Tadigadapa was formed into a first grade municipality by merging into one the villages Tadigadapa, Kanuru, Yanamalakuduru and Poranki by decree of the Government of Andhra Pradesh. It also stands as a major suburb region of Vijayawada.

Education 
Primary and secondary school education is provided by the local government. Aided and private schools also function under the School Education Department of State. Instruction in schools is in English and/or Telugu.

See also 
List of census towns in Andhra Pradesh

References 

Neighbourhoods in Vijayawada